The 1993 Korean League Cup, also known as the Adidas Cup 1993, was the third competition of the Korean League Cup.

Table

Matches

Awards

Source:

See also
1993 K League

References

External links
Official website
RSSSF

1993
1993
1993 domestic association football cups
1993 in South Korean football